Roy Baker may refer to:

 Roy Baker (footballer) (born 1954), English association football player
 Bullet Baker (Roy Marlon Baker, 1901–1961), American football player
 Roy Thomas Baker (born 1946), British music producer
 Roy Ward Baker (1916–2010), British film director, also credited as Roy Baker
 Roy Baker (politician) (born 1945), American politician from Nebraska